8-way may refer to:
8-way can refer to a formation skydiving event, 8-way sequential, called that because of the number of members in a team.
8-way also has something to do with Symmetric multiprocessing